Pachygaster leachii, the yellow-legged black, is a European species of soldier fly.

Description
A minute fly of brilliant black color with a round abdomen and a body length of around 2.5-3.5 mm. The eyes are brown-red in males and obscure green in females. Both males and females have yellow antennae. The legs are of a pale yellow with a blackish ring, sometimes quite wide, at the apex of femora III. It has yellowish wings with pale veins. The halteres are yellowish-brown at the base.

Biology
The habitat is woodland with oak and elm. Associated with alder, hazel. The flight period is from June to August.

Distribution

Northwest and Western Europe, Russia, Caucasus, Trans-Caucasus.

References

External links
Images representing Pachygaster leachii at Bold

Stratiomyidae
Diptera of Europe
Insects described in 1824